The Moses Packard House is a historic house located at 647 Main Street in Brockton, Massachusetts.

Description and history 
It is a -story wood-frame structure, with a first floor finished in rusticated stone. The house has a variety of gables, projections, and porches, typical of the Queen Anne style, including a three-story turret capped by a conical roof. It was built in 1897 by Moses Packard, a prominent local shoemaker, and is one of the city's finest examples of Queen Anne architecture.

The house was listed on the National Register of Historic Places in 1978. The house now serves as the Dahlborg-MacNevin Funeral Home.

See also
 National Register of Historic Places listings in Plymouth County, Massachusetts

References

Houses in Brockton, Massachusetts
Death care companies of the United States
National Register of Historic Places in Plymouth County, Massachusetts
Houses on the National Register of Historic Places in Plymouth County, Massachusetts
Houses completed in 1897
Queen Anne architecture in Massachusetts